The Countess Charming is a lost 1917 American silent comedy film directed by Donald Crisp and written by Gelett Burgess, Carolyn Wells, and Gardner Hunting. The film stars Julian Eltinge, Florence Vidor, Tully Marshall, George Kuwa, Edythe Chapman, and Mabel Van Buren. The film was released on September 16, 1917, by Paramount Pictures.

Plot
As described in a film magazine, upon insulting the Vandergrafts, leaders of the North Shore Club, Stanley Jordan (Eltinge) is forced out of society. Determined to be near his sweetheart Betty (Vidor), he becomes the Countess Raffelski. He takes the North Shore colony by storm. At many of the social functions valuables have been stolen and the  guilty person cannot be found. Suspicion is thrown upon the countess and, to escape all, Stanley spreads the rumor that the countess is dead. He wins Betty and with the money from the stolen jewels he is able to make a large contribution to the Red Cross fund.

Cast 
Julian Eltinge as Stanley Jordan / Countess Raffelski
Florence Vidor as Betty Lovering
Tully Marshall as Dr. John Cavendish
George Kuwa as Soto
Edythe Chapman as Mrs. Lovering
Mabel Van Buren as	Mrs. Vandergraft
Gustav von Seyffertitz as Jacob Vandergraft
William Elmer as Detective Boyle 
Mrs. George Kuwa as The Maid

Reception
Like many American films of the time, The Countess Charming was subject to cuts by city and state film censorship boards. The Chicago Board of Censors required cuts in scenes showing the theft of a pin from a tie and of a purse, and taking a wallet from a pocket.

References

External links 

 

1917 films
1910s English-language films
Silent American comedy films
1917 comedy films
Paramount Pictures films
Films directed by Donald Crisp
American black-and-white films
American silent feature films
1910s American films